The Di Rudinì V government of Italy held office from 1 June 1898 until 29 June 1898, a total of 28 days.

Government parties
The government was composed by the following parties:

Composition

References

Italian governments
1898 establishments in Italy